The Highland Range is a mountain range in Lincoln County, Nevada. Nearby ranges include the Bristol Range to the north, the West Range to the northwest, the Ely Springs Range to the west, the Black Canyon Range to the southwest, the Chief Range to the south and the Pioche Hills to the east.

Mine workings in the range are associated with the historic Pioche silver mining district.

The range was named after the Scottish Highlands, the ancestral home of a pioneer citizen.

References 

 USGS Highland Peak, NV Quad with Mapquest

Mountain ranges of Nevada
Mountain ranges of the Great Basin
Mountain ranges of Lincoln County, Nevada